Sergey Kudryayev (born 1 September 1969) is a Russian swimmer. He competed in the men's 4 × 200 metre freestyle relay at the 1988 Summer Olympics representing the Soviet Union.

References

1969 births
Living people
Russian male swimmers
Olympic swimmers of the Soviet Union
Swimmers at the 1988 Summer Olympics
Place of birth missing (living people)
Soviet male swimmers
Russian male freestyle swimmers